Kenji Onuma (Japanese: 大沼 賢治, born 12 March 1931) is a retired Japanese lightweight weightlifter who won a silver medal at the 1958 Asian Games. In that same year, he set an unofficial world record in the clean and jerk. Onuma placed fourth in weightlifting in the 1956 Summer Olympics and competed in weightlifting in the 1960 Summer Olympics.

References

 

1931 births
Possibly living people
Japanese male weightlifters
Olympic weightlifters of Japan
Weightlifters at the 1956 Summer Olympics
Weightlifters at the 1960 Summer Olympics
Asian Games medalists in weightlifting
Asian Games silver medalists for Japan
Weightlifters at the 1958 Asian Games
Medalists at the 1958 Asian Games
20th-century Japanese people
21st-century Japanese people